Hervé Arsène (born 30 October 1963) is a Malagasy football coach and former player who played as a defender with US Saint André, RC Lens and La Roche Vendée Football.

Career
Born in Nosy Be, Madagascar, Arsène began playing football for local side AS Sotema. In 1985, he moved to Réunion where he would play for US Saint-André.

In 1987, Arsène joined Ligue 1 side RC Lens, and he would spend nearly a decade with the club, winning the 1997–98 French Division 1 title during his tenure. He also spent two seasons in Ligue 2 with La Roche Vendée Football.

He has also managed the Malagasy national side.

Personal life
Arsène's son, Faed, is also an international footballer from Madagascar.

References

External links

Profile
Profile at Afterfoot.fr

1963 births
Living people
People from Nosy Be
Association football defenders
Malagasy footballers
Madagascar international footballers
French footballers
AS Sotema players
RC Lens players
La Roche VF players
Ligue 1 players
Malagasy expatriate footballers
Malagasy expatriate sportspeople in France
Expatriate footballers in France
Expatriate footballers in Réunion
French football managers
Malagasy football managers
Madagascar national football team managers